Charles "Charlie" Arthur Pollard (27 August 1897 – 1 October 1968) was an English professional rugby league footballer who played in the 1910s, 1920s and 1930s, and coached in the 1930s.

Background
Charlie Pollard was born in Wakefield, West Riding of Yorkshire, England, and he died aged 71 in Wakefield, West Riding of Yorkshire, England.

Playing career

International honours
Charlie Pollard won a cap for Great Britain while at Wakefield Trinity, he played  in Great Britain's 11-13 defeat by New Zealand in the 2nd test match at Basin Reserve, Wellington on Wednesday 6 August 1924.

County honours
Charlie Pollard won cap(s) for Yorkshire while at Wakefield Trinity.

County Cup Final appearances
Charlie Pollard played . i.e. number 2, in Wakefield Trinity's 9–8 victory over Batley in the 1924–25 Yorkshire County Cup Final during the 1924–25 season at Headingley Rugby Stadium, Leeds on Saturday 22 November 1924, and played , i.e. number 5, in the 3–10 defeat by Huddersfield in the 1926–27 Yorkshire County Cup Final during the 1926–27 season at Headingley Rugby Stadium, Leeds on Wednesday 1 December 1926, the original match on Saturday 27 November 1926 was postponed due to fog.

Notable tour matches
Charlie Pollard played  in Wakefield Trinity's 3–29 defeat by Australia in the 1921–22 Kangaroo tour of Great Britain match at Belle Vue, Wakefield on Saturday 22 October 1921.

Club career
Charlie Pollard made his début for Wakefield Trinity during August 1919, he played his last match for Wakefield Trinity during December 1932, he appears to have scored no drop-goals (or field-goals as they are currently known in Australasia), but prior to the 1974–75 season all goals, whether; conversions, penalties, or drop-goals, scored 2-points, consequently prior to this date drop-goals were often not explicitly documented, therefore '0' drop-goals may indicate drop-goals not recorded, rather than no drop-goals scored. In addition, prior to the 1949–50 season, the archaic field-goal was also still a valid means of scoring points.

Testimonial match
Charlie Pollard's Testimonial match for Wakefield Trinity was the 8–7 victory over Leeds at Belle Vue, Wakefield on Saturday 19 March 1927.

Coaching career

Club career
Charlie Pollard was the coach of Batley from July 1935 to March 1939.

Genealogical Information
Charlie Pollard's marriage to Nora Gwendoline (née Brownhill) (birth registered during third ¼ 1905 in Wortley district) was registered during second ¼ 1926 in Wakefield district. They had 3 children; the rugby league footballer Roy Pollard; Oxford University RFC, Wakefield RFC, Colwyn Bay RFC and North Wales rugby (captain) rugby union footballer David Pollard (birth registered during fourth ¼ 1929 in Wakefield district); and Barbara M. Pollard (birth registered during third ¼ 1932 in Wakefield district), Charles was the older brother of the rugby league footballer; Ernest Pollard, the Wakefield Trinity  of the 1930s; Lionel Pollard (birth registered during first ¼ 1913 in Wakefield district), Frank Pollard (birth registered during first ¼ 1914 in Wakefield district), Donald Pollard (birth registered during second ¼ 1916 in Wakefield district), and Wilfred Pollard (birth registered during second ¼ 1917 in Wakefield district), and was the uncle of the Wakefield RFC rugby union footballer from 1956 to 1958; Anthony Pollard (birth registered during third ¼ 1935 in Wakefield district).

Outside rugby league
Charlie Pollard was the Landlord of the Graziers' Hotel, Belle Vue, Wakefield .

References

External links
!Great Britain Statistics at englandrl.co.uk (statistics currently missing due to not having appeared for both Great Britain, and England)

1897 births
1968 deaths
Batley Bulldogs coaches
English rugby league coaches
English rugby league players
Great Britain national rugby league team players
Place of death missing
Publicans
Rugby league centres
Rugby league fullbacks
Rugby league wingers
Rugby league players from Wakefield
Wakefield Trinity captains
Wakefield Trinity players
Yorkshire rugby league team players